Adam Mynott (born October 1957 in Eastbourne) is a journalist.

Education
Mynott was educated at the independent schools Ascham and Eastbourne College followed by Exeter University in 1980 with a degree in Philosophy.

Career
Mynott first joined the BBC as a trainee radio reporter in 1981 and then worked for BBC Radio Leeds in the mid-1980s. Since then he has worked on The Today programme covering amongst other issues The First Gulf War (1991). He then had a spell in New York City but returned in 1992 to work as a BBC News reporter. Since then he has worked as a sports correspondent and as a South Asia correspondent from 2001. He became BBC Nairobi correspondent in August 2004.

Mynott was embedded with US Marines during the second (2003) Gulf War. His experiences were published in a book written by BBC correspondents.

In 2009, Mynott returned to the UK and became a BBC World Affairs Correspondent. After 3 years at G4S plc as Director of Media Relations, he joined the Chinese telecommunications company, Huawei in September 2014.

Personal life
Mynott is married to Carol (née Schug), and has three children.

References

 Beck, S & Downing, M (ed.)(2003) The Battle for Iraq: BBC News Correspondents on the War against Saddam and a New World Agenda BBC Books 

1957 births
Living people
Alumni of the University of Exeter
BBC newsreaders and journalists